Pinewood is an unincorporated community and census-designated place (CDP) in Miami-Dade County, Florida, United States. The population was 17,246 at the 2020 census.

Most of Pinewood was originally a neighborhood of the City of Miami, annexed into the city in 1925. With the arrival of the Great Depression, Miami gave up its jurisdiction and Pinewood became an unincorporated area of Miami-Dade County.

Geography
It is bordered to the north by the city of North Miami, to the east by Miami Shores and unincorporated neighborhoods, to the south and southwest by unincorporated West Little River, and to the northwest by unincorporated Westview. U.S. Route 441 (NW 7th Avenue) forms most of the eastern border of Pinewood.

Demographics

2020 census

Note: the US Census treats Hispanic/Latino as an ethnic category. This table excludes Latinos from the racial categories and assigns them to a separate category. Hispanics/Latinos can be of any race.

2000 Census
As of the census of 2000, there were 16,523 people, 5,029 households, and 3,686 families residing in the CDP. The racial makeup of the CDP was 19.26% White (3.6% were Non-Hispanic White,) 71.05% African American, 0.25% Native American, 0.33% Asian, 0.03% Pacific Islander, 3.59% from other races, and 5.50% from two or more races. Hispanic or Latino of any race were 22.85% of the population.

There were 5,029 households, out of which 41.0% had children under the age of 18 living with them, 36.3% were married couples living together, 28.5% had a female householder with no husband present, and 26.7% were non-families. 21.7% of all households were made up of individuals, and 6.9% had someone living alone who was 65 years of age or older.  The average household size was 3.25 and the average family size was 3.77.

In the CDP, the population was spread out, with 32.1% under the age of 18, 11.2% from 18 to 24, 26.6% from 25 to 44, 21.2% from 45 to 64, and 8.9% who were 65 years of age or older.  The median age was 30 years. For every 100 females, there were 92.6 males.  For every 100 females age 18 and over, there were 88.9 males.

The median income for a household in the CDP was $24,949, and the median income for a family was $26,548. Males had a median income of $22,439 versus $18,046 for females. The per capita income for the CDP was $10,169.  About 30.2% of families and 33.5% of the population were below the poverty line, including 45.9% of those under age 18 and 21.2% of those age 65 or over.

As of 2000, speakers of English as a first language accounted for 47.40% of residents, while French Creole made up 28.93%, Spanish was at 22.09%, and French was the mother tongue of 1.56% of the population.

References

Census-designated places in Miami-Dade County, Florida
Census-designated places in Florida